Goldbeck is a municipality in the district of Stendal, in Saxony-Anhalt, Germany. In January 2009 it absorbed the former municipality Bertkow.

References

Stendal (district)